Frank Thorman "Buzz" Boll (March 6, 1911 – January 23, 1990) was a Canadian professional ice hockey left winger who played 11 seasons in the National Hockey League for the Toronto Maple Leafs, New York Americans, Brooklyn Americans and Boston Bruins between 1933 and 1944. He was born in Fillmore, Saskatchewan.

Playing career
Frank Boll played for the Toronto Maple Leafs from 1933–34 to 1938–39. He then played two seasons for the New York Americans and one for the Brooklyn Americans when the franchise was renamed for the start of the 1941–42 season. He finished his NHL career playing for the Boston Bruins in 1942–43 and 1943–44.

Career statistics

Regular season and playoffs

External links

1911 births
1990 deaths
Brooklyn Americans players
Boston Bruins players
Canadian expatriate ice hockey players in the United States
Canadian ice hockey left wingers
Ice hockey people from Saskatchewan
New York Americans players
Regina Pats players
Syracuse Stars (IHL) players
Toronto Maple Leafs players
Toronto Marlboros players